Vesna Stojanović (born 24 January 1973) is a Serbian former football striker. She played in Serbia and Greece, appearing in the UEFA Women's Cup with Mašinac Niš and AE Aegina.

She was a member of the Serbian national team for fourteen years.

References

1973 births
Living people
Women's association football forwards
Serbian women's footballers
Serbia women's international footballers
Serbian expatriate women's footballers
Serbian expatriate sportspeople in Greece
Expatriate women's footballers in Greece
ŽFK Mašinac PZP Niš players